The year 1974 was the third year after the independence of Bangladesh. It was also the third year of the first post-independence government in Bangladesh. The year saw a period of mass starvation beginning in March 1974 and ending in about December of the same year. The famine, allegedly causing death of a million people, is considered the worst in recent decades.

Incumbents

 President: Mohammad Mohammadullah
 Prime Minister: Sheikh Mujibur Rahman
 Chief Justice: Abu Sadat Mohammad Sayem

Demography

Climate

Economy

Note: For the year 1974 average official exchange rate for BDT was 8.23 per US$.

Events

 22 February – Pakistan recognizes Bangladesh.
 17 March – Members of Jatiya Rakkhi Bahini fired upon demonstrators from the Jatiyo Samajtantarik Dal, who were blockading the residence of the Home Minister Mansur Ali, located in the Ramna area of Dhaka. The incident reportedly claimed at least fifty lives.
 9 April – A tripartite agreement is signed among Bangladesh, India and Pakistan regarding post-war humanitarian issues.
 16 May  – A land boundary agreement was signed between Indira Gandhi and Sheikh Mujibur Rahman which provided for the exchange of enclaves and the surrender of adverse possessions.
 17 September – Bangladesh joins the United Nations.
 24 September – Sheikh Mujibur Rahman addresses the UN General Assembly in Bengali.
 28 November – Third Amendment to the Constitution of Bangladesh was passed bringing changes in Article 2 of the constitution. An agreement was made between Bangladesh and India in respect of exchange of certain enclaves and fixation of boundary lines between the countries.
 28 December – In the face of growing unrest, Prime Minister Sheikh Mujibur Rahman declares a state of emergency.

Sports
 Domestic football: Abahani KC won the Dhaka League title, while Dilkusha SC came out runners-up.

Births
 Ziaur Rahman, chess player
 Reefat Bin-Sattar, chess player
 Chanchal Chowdhury, actor
 Rajeeb Samdani, industrialist
 Tanzir Tuhin, musician
 Bobby Hajjaj, politician
 Bimal Tarafdar, sprinter

Deaths
 11 February – Syed Mujtaba Ali, writer (b. 1904)
 13 May – Khuda Buksh, humanitarian (b. 1912)
 12 June – M. A. Hannan, politician (b. 1930)
 5 October – Abul Hashim, politician (b. 1905)
 2 November – Mohammad Barkatullah, writer (b. 1898)
 5 November – Barada Bhushan Chakraborty, revolutionary peasant leader (b. 1901)

See also 
 1970s in Bangladesh
 List of Bangladeshi films of 1974
 Timeline of Bangladeshi history

References